Kenneth Muguna (born 6 January 1996) is a Kenyan footballer who plays as a midfielder for Azam fc in the Tanzania Vodacom Premier League . He also represents the Kenyan National Team, Harambee Stars.

International career

International goals
Scores and results list Kenya's goal tally first.

Honours

Club
Tirana
 Albanian First Division : Winner Group B
 Albanian First Division : 2017-2018
Gor mahia
Kenya premier league 2019

References

External links
Gor Mahia official: I wish Kenneth Muguna could stay 
Kenneth Muguna wins Kenyan Premier League Player of the Year award

1996 births
Living people
Kenyan footballers
Gor Mahia F.C. players
KF Tirana players
Association football midfielders
Kenya international footballers
People from Meru County